Lee Gwang-jin (born 5 December 1970) is a South Korean badminton player. He competed at the 1988 Summer Olympics, 1992 Summer Olympics and the 1996 Summer Olympics.

References

External links
 

1970 births
Living people
South Korean male badminton players
Olympic badminton players of South Korea
Badminton players at the 1992 Summer Olympics
Badminton players at the 1996 Summer Olympics
Place of birth missing (living people)
Badminton players at the 1988 Summer Olympics